Guilherme Paraense (25 June 1884 – 18 April 1968) was a Brazilian sport shooter and Olympic Champion. He was the first Brazilian to win an Olympic gold medal.

Paraense was born in Belém.  He won a gold medal at the 1920 Summer Olympics in Antwerp, in the Rapid-Fire Pistol event. He was also part of the Brazilian team which earned a bronze medal in Military Revolver.

He also finished fourth with the Brazilian team in the team 30 metre military pistol competition. He also participated in the individual 50 metre free pistol event but his place is unknown.

Paraense died in Rio de Janeiro, aged 83.

References

1884 births
1968 deaths
Brazilian male sport shooters
ISSF pistol shooters
Olympic shooters of Brazil
Shooters at the 1920 Summer Olympics
Olympic gold medalists for Brazil
Olympic bronze medalists for Brazil
Olympic medalists in shooting
Medalists at the 1920 Summer Olympics
Sportspeople from Belém
19th-century Brazilian people
20th-century Brazilian people